"For the Love of Him" is the title track from a 1969 album by Bobbi Martin who wrote the song with her producer Henry Jerome (who used the pseudonym Al Mortimer).

Chart performance
The single was her most successful release on both the Pop and Easy Listening charts in the United States, peaking at #13 on Billboard magazine's Hot 100 Pop chart and reaching #1 on the magazine's Easy Listening chart for two weeks in May 1970. "For The Love of Him" also afforded Martin a hit in Canada (#9) and Australia (#14).

See also
List of number-one adult contemporary singles of 1970 (U.S.)

References

1969 singles
Shania Twain songs
1969 songs